Linyanti is a constituency in the Zambezi Region of Namibia. As of 2020, the constituency had 4,493 registered voters. The area includes a large marshland. In August 2013, Linyanti Constituency lost its western part, which became a constituency of its own, namely Judea Lyaboloma Constituency.

Politics 
The first councillor was Fani Francis Sizimbo, a Democratic Turnhalle Alliance (DTA) member, who won the inaugural 1992 regional election and was in office until 1998. In the 1998 regional election the constituency was won by Lichaba John Ndubano in 1998. Ndubano, a SWAPO member, managed to move the SWAPO office from Linyanti to Sangwali. He did not support secessionism, and as a result was not liked in secessionist dominated areas.

In the 2004 regional elections SWAPO was represented by Dorothy Kabula, and in 2010 by Cletius Sipapela, who successively won the constituency elections. In the 2015 regional election Sipapela was reelected with 1,480 votes, followed by Ivene Visitor Kabunga of the Rally for Democracy and Progress (RDP) with 1,191 votes. Charles Wuyeni Matemwa of the Democratic Turnhalle Alliance (DTA) also ran and received 19 votes.

The 2020 regional election was won by Ivene Vistor Kabunga, an independent candidate. He received 1,903 votes. SWAPO's candidate Mwangala Sonnia Musukubili came second with 925 votes.

Traditional authorities
Linyanti is the only constituency in the region with three chiefs: Chief Mayuni of the Mashi Traditional Authority, chief Shufu of the Bayeyi and chief Mamili of the Mafwe.  Over decades, Chief Mamili was the sole traditional authority in the constituency until the Bayeyi declared themselves an independent tribe in 1992 and Mayuni divorced himself in 1994 to form the Mashi Traditional Authority.

References

External links
 Flying the falls for aerial images of the Linyanti
 Free to Adventure for Videos of the Linyanti

Constituencies of Zambezi Region